Chhatri is a village in Ajmer District, Rajasthan, India.

See also 

 Ghooghra
 Godiyawas
 Guwardi
 Magra, Ajmer
 Khonda
 Ganahera
 Deo Nagar
 Chachiyawas

References 

Villages in Ajmer district